The Saint-Pauloise FC is a football club based in Saint-Paul, Réunion, France.

History
The club was established in 2000 following the merger of two clubs from Saint-Paul: the SS St. Pauloise and Olympique de Saint-Paul. It has the largest number of licensees: 1063.

In 2003 the club was promoted to D1P, and lost in the finals of the Regional Cup in France against the USST 1–0. After the end of season 2007, the club was relegated to D2R. It returned to D1P the following season as champions of D2R. In 2010, the club won the St. Pauloise Regional Cup: France against AS Excelsior. In the 7th round of the Coupe de France they lost 1–0 against Lannion. It was in 2011 and during the last day of D1P, the club won the championship by defeating the Tamponnaise 2–0. St. Pauloise FC claimed the double by winning the Cup Meeting 1–0 (aet) against SS Saint-Louis.

The club decided not to participate in the Champions League CAF 2012 for financial reasons, but took part in the 2nd edition of the Indian Ocean Champion Clubs' Cup in 2012. The 2012 season was marked by the defeat in the final of the Indian Ocean Champion Clubs' Cup facing CNAPS Sport (2–1 victory on the way).

Saint-Pauloise also won the Reunion championship in 2014 under the guidance of Jean-Jacques Charolais.

Awards
This section includes awards for both the current and merged teams.

SS St. Pauloise
Champion Reunion D1P (5)
1979, 1981, 1983, 1985, 1986

St. Pauloise FC
Champion Reunion D1P (2)
2011, 2014 
Reunion Cup (1)
2011
Champion of D2R Reunion (1)
2008

Players

References

External links
 Official Site 

Football clubs in Réunion
2000 establishments in Réunion
Association football clubs established in 2000